In My Own Words is the debut studio album of American singer-songwriter Ne-Yo. It was released by Def Jam Recordings on February 28, 2006. Conceived following his songwriting breakthrough with "Let Me Love You" for fellow R&B singer Mario in 2004, Ne-Yo worked with musicians Ron "Neff-U" Feemster, Brandon Howard, Shea Taylor, and Curtis "Sauce" Wilson, as well as Norwegian production duo Stargate on most of the album, some of which would become regular contributors on subsequent projects. The singer co-wrote the lyrics for each song on In My Own Words which features guest appearances by rappers Peedi Peedi and Ghostface Killah.

Upon its release, the album received generally positive reviews from most music critics and earned a Grammy Award nomination in the Best Contemporary R&B Album category. It debuted at number one on the US Billboard 200, with 301,000 copies sold, and reached the top ten of the Canadian Albums Chart. It was subsequently certified platinum by Recording Industry Association of America (RIAA), with 1,5 million copies sold in the United States, and became a platinum-seller in Australia, Japan, and the United Kingdom as well. Four singles were released from the album, including "Stay", "When You're Mad", "Sexy Love", and the number-one hit "So Sick". In further support, Ne-Yo went on tour in August 2006 with singer Chris Brown and Dem Franchize Boyz.

Critical reception

At Metacritic, which assigns a normalized rating out of 100 to reviews from critics, the album received an average score of 69, which indicates "generally favorable" reviews, based on 11 reviews. AllMusic editor Andy Kellman gave In My Own Words a four-and-a-half-out-of-five-stars-rating and noted that it "could turn out to be the most impressive R&B debut of 2006, as well as one of several milestones in a lengthy career [...]  It's very focused and surprisingly taut, especially for a debut that involves several producers [...] Its modern approach, interlocked with touches of '70s and '80s R&B sensibilities, is also in effect for the entirety of the album." In his review for USA Today, Steve Jones remarked that "Ne-Yo is the latest in a recent line of engaging young R&B singers but with his own words he sets himself apart [...] On his soulful solo debut, it's apparent that the Las Vegas-bred singer saved some of his best lyrical work for himself."

Dan Nishimoto from PopMatters declared the album a "notable success. With spare but clean, rounded yet consistent production, the album has an appealing azure quality." Billboard found that "though, at times, the lyrics are a bit too sentimental and production is spotty, In My Own Words should have listeners clinging to Ne-Yo's every word." Kelefa Sanneh, writer for The New York Times, complimented Ne-Yo for his "smooth" writing and added: "Not everything on this CD is that brilliant, or that shameless, but Ne-Yo is a deft and appealing player in the game of modern-day R&B." Slightly less impressed, Slant Magazines Sal Cinquemani found that In My Own Words "might pale next to [John] Legend’s stellar debut, but, even at its Robert Kelly worst, it’s not hateable. And isn’t that all one can ask for from mainstream R&B these days?" Blender wrote that "even at its weepiest, his music, thankfully, stays vivacious." Raymond Fiore from Entertainment Weekly called the album a "confident if slightly underwhelming debut."

Commercial performance 
In his home country of the United States, In My Own Words debuted at number one on the Billboard 200, with 301,000 copies sold in its first week. In its second week, the album remained in the top ten at Billboard 200, fell to number five, selling 113,000 copies (down 62 percent). In its third week, the album jump to number four on the chart, selling 77,000 copies (down 33 percent). On March 29, 2006, the album has been certified platinum by the Recording Industry Association of America (RIAA), for sales of over a million copies. As of March 2007, In My Own Words has sold 1.4 million copies in the United States.

Track listing

Notes
 signifies an additional producer
Sample credits
"Stay" contains an interpolation of "Stay with Me", written by Mark DeBarge and Etterlene Jordan, and performed by DeBarge.
"It Just Ain't Right" contains a sample of "I Call Your Name", written by Bobby DeBarge and Gregory Williams, and performed Switch.
"Get Down Like That" contains a sample from The O'Jays' "I Swear, I Love No One But You", written by Bunny Sigler and performed by The O'Jays.

Personnel
Credits adapted from album's liner notes.

Tom Coyne – mastering
Kevin "KD" Davis – mixing (tracks 3–6, 8, 9, 11, 13)
Mikkel S. Eriksen – producer, engineer, and all instruments (tracks 3, 10–12)
Ron "Neff-U" Feemstar – producer (tracks 1, 7)
Ghostface Killah – rap (track 13)
Larry Gold – strings (track 12)
Tor Erik Hermansen – producer and all instruments (tracks 3, 10–12)
Robert "Bob the Builder" Horn – engineer and mixing (tracks 1, 2, 7)
Brandon Howard – additional production (track 8)
Alrad "Boola" Lewis – producer (track 8)
Ne-Yo – vocals (all tracks)
Peedi Peedi – vocals (track 1)
Dave Pensado – mixing (track 12)
Ervin "EP" Pope – producer (tracks 9, 13)
Brian "B-Nasty" Reid – producer (track 2)
Nisan Stewart – drums (track 12)
Sean Tallman – additional engineering (tracks 3, 4, 6, 9, 13)
Phil Tan – mixing (track 10)
Shea Taylor – producer and guitar (tracks 4, 6)
Michael Tocci – engineer (track 5)
Curtis "Sauce" Wilson – producer (track 5), engineer (tracks 4, 6, 9, 13)

Charts

Weekly charts

Year-end charts

Certifications

References

External links 
 In My Own Words at Discogs
 
 Album review at The Village Voice
 Album Review at The Washington Post

2006 debut albums
Ne-Yo albums
Def Jam Recordings albums
Albums produced by Stargate
Albums produced by Theron Feemster
Albums recorded at Westlake Recording Studios